Lawrence M. "Larry" Walsh, Sr. (March 3, 1948 – June 3, 2020) was an American farmer and politician.

Born in Joliet, Illinois, Walsh graduated from Joliet East High School in 1966. He then received his associate degree in business and agriculture from Joliet Junior College in 1968. He was a farmer. Walsh served on the Elwood, Illinois School Board and the Jackson Township board. He also served on the Will County, Illinois Board of Commissioners and was a Democrat. Walsh served in the Illinois State Senate from 1997 to 2005. A.J. Wilhelmi succeed him in the Illinois Senate. In 2005, Walsh became the Will County Executive. Walsh died at the age of 72 on June 3, 2020. In 2022, the post office in Elwood, Illinois was renamed in honor of Walsh.

References

1948 births
2020 deaths
People from Joliet, Illinois
Joliet Junior College alumni
Farmers from Illinois
School board members in Illinois
Illinois city council members
County executives in Illinois
Democratic Party Illinois state senators